Brett Jungblut is an American professional poker player, born in Atlantic City, New Jersey and based in Las Vegas, Nevada. With only one class left to graduate college, Jungblut dropped out to pursue his dream as a professional poker player.

Jungblut attended Voorhees High School, graduated in 1997.

Jungblut began playing tournament poker in 2002. Since then he has over twenty in the money tournament finishes including first-place finishes at the Bicycle Casino's Winnin' o' the Green limit Texas hold 'em event and the World Series of Poker (WSOP) Omaha Hi-Lo World championship in 2004.

Jungblut was a former member of "The Crew" alongside Scott Fischman, Dutch Boyd, Joe Bartholdi and others.

Jungblut helped organize the first Los Angeles Youth Network All In For The Kids" benefit poker tournament, raising funds for building new housing facilities and schools for homeless children.

Since 2005, Jungblut has been teaching poker strategy via his Pro Poker School website. In 2009, Jungblut signed on as a team pro with Lock Poker.

As of 2012, his total live tournament winnings exceed $440,000.

Notes

American poker players
Living people
World Series of Poker bracelet winners
Year of birth missing (living people)
American people of German descent
People from Atlantic City, New Jersey
Voorhees High School alumni